The Women's Individual Pursuit was one of the 7 women's events at the 2007 UCI Track Cycling World Championships, held in Palma de Mallorca, Spain.

24 Cyclists from 17 countries participated in the contest. After the qualification, the fastest 2 riders advanced to the Final and the 3rd and 4th best riders raced for the bronze medal.

The qualification took place on 30 March and the Finals later the same day.

World record

Qualifying

Finals

References

Women's individual pursuit
UCI Track Cycling World Championships – Women's individual pursuit
UCI